The Cobra Strikes is a 1948 American mystery film directed by Charles Reisner and starring Sheila Ryan, Richard Fraser, and Leslie Brooks. In the UK, it was released as Crime Without Clues.

Plot
Dr. Damon Cameron is shot while leaving his laboratory in route to a state medical banquet where he planned to reveal his new invention.  At the time his twin brother Ted is keeping an appointment with Victor Devereaux and Franz Lang, colleagues in his importing business, at a local club.  Devereaux angerly warns Ted to stay away from his wife.  A brain surgeon believes he might be able to save Damon, but there will be severe memory loss.  Police captain Monihan and Sergeant Harris have informed Cameron's daughter Dale and brother Ted of the shooting.  With the police captain's permission, Mike Kent, a newspaper writer and crime investigator, searches Damon's laboratory, but finds nothing.  Mike meets with one of Ted's business partners, Hyder Ali from India, at the Safari Club's steam room.  They both become suspects when Victor Devereaux dies hidden by the steam.

Olga Kaminoff arrives at Devereaux's funeral claiming to be the love of his life, and when she asks to see the body, they find the coffin empty.  When the body is found in a bay the autopsy reveals the cause of death was poison.  Monihan arrests Lang, as Kent suspects a connection between Damon's invention and Devereaux's murder.  Monihan arranges a meeting with all the suspects, Dale, and Ted.  While watching a home movie of a hunting trip in India, Dale notices that an ivory elephant of value has disappeared from the mantel.  Lang is killed by the same poison that killed Devereaux, cobra venom.  Ali is then found dead with the ivory elephant nearby.  When Damon recovers enough to reveal that his invention is an insulin hypo-spray, he also mentions that only his brother knew of it.  Mike figures that Ted is the criminal, but Ted then takes Dale hostage with threats to poison her as well.  Mike and the cops outwit Ted and capture him; then Olga is revealed to be mystery story writer.  After the murders are solved Mike and Dale realize that they appear to have a bit of romantic chemistry.

Cast
 Sheila Ryan as Dale Cameron 
 Richard Fraser as Michael Kent 
 Leslie Brooks as Olga Kaminoff 
 Herbert Heyes as Theodore Cameron / Dr. Damon Cameron 
 James Seay as Police Capt. Monihan 
 Richard Loo as Hyder Ali 
 Lyle Latell as Police Sgt. Harris 
 Pat Flaherty as Atlas Kilroy 
 Philip Ahn as Kasim—Houseboy 
 Fred Nurney as Franz Lang 
 Leslie Denison as Morton—New Butler 
 George Sorel as Victor Devereaux 
 Selmer Jackson as Dr. Keating 
 Dean Riesner as Detective Brody 
 Howard Negley as Safari Club Doorman 
 Milton Parsons as Mr. Weems, Mortician 
 George Chandler as Joe Gates - Night Watchman 
 Virginia Farmer as Mrs. Gause - Housekeeper 
 Victor Cutler as Policeman at Conclusion 
 James Logan as Bartender

References

Bibliography
 Thomas S. Hischak. The Encyclopedia of Film Composers. Rowman & Littlefield, 2015.

External links

1948 films
American mystery films
American black-and-white films
1948 mystery films
Films directed by Charles Reisner
Eagle-Lion Films films
1940s English-language films
1940s American films